Oued El Ma is a small town in the Aures region, and administratively is a municipality (French:  commune) in the province of Batna. The name Oud El Ma is derived from the Berber name ″Ighzer n'Alma″, with 'Oud' means river that come from the mountains and 'Alma' means the mount of Telmet mountain.

Communes of Batna Province
Cities in Algeria
Algeria